Hiland Orlando Stickney (February 19, 1867 – October 6, 1911) was an American football player and coach.  He served as the head football coach at Grinnell College in 1893 and at the University of Wisconsin–Madison from 1894 to 1895. In 1899, Highland Stickney became the fifth head coach of Oregon State.  He took over the team after they played the 1898 season without a head coach.  He served as the head coach for just one season.  He went 3–2 in that season.

Head coaching record

References

External links
 

1867 births
1911 deaths
19th-century players of American football
American football tackles
Grinnell Pioneers football coaches
Harvard Crimson football players
Oregon State Beavers football coaches
Wisconsin Badgers football coaches
People from Plymouth, Vermont
Coaches of American football from Vermont
Players of American football from Vermont